The Buresh Archeological Site (14SR303), near Caldwell in Sumner County, Kansas, was listed on the National Register of Historic Places in on May 14, 1971.

The Buresh site is part of here Bluff Creek complex, defined by archaeologist Tom Witty, part of the Middle Ceramic period and possibly related to the Washita focus of Oklahoma. Witty excavated the remains of four houses here. Two houses are square, one is oval, and one is rectangular.

The site yielded rounded ceramic jars and bowls, mainly tempered with sand or bone.

Radiocarbon dating estimated AD 1050 as the date of the site, but the dating method was deemed unreliable.

Notes

References 
  (PDF)

Archaeological sites on the National Register of Historic Places in Kansas
National Register of Historic Places in Sumner County, Kansas
Plains Village period
Former Native American populated places in the United States
Native American history of Kansas